The 2013 Campeonato Roraimense de Futebol was the 54th edition of the Roraima's top professional football league. The competition began on April 6, and ended on May 29. Náutico won the championship by the 2nd time.

Format
On the first stage, all teams play against each other in a double round-robin. The best team in each round advance to the finals. The finals are played in two-legged ties.

The first round is named Taça Boa Vista and the second round is named Taça Roraima.

Qualifications
The champion qualify to the 2013 Campeonato Brasileiro Série D and the 2014 Copa do Brasil.

Participating teams

First round (Taça Boa Vista)

Standings

Results

Second round (Taça Roraima)

Standings

Results

Final stage

Náutico Futebol Clube is the champion of the 2013 Campeonato Roraimense.

References

Roraimense
2013